Andris Karlis Zesers (born 11 March 1967) is a former Australian cricketer. He played as a right-arm specialist fast bowler.

The son of a Latvian-born construction worker, Zesers ascended quickly to first-class ranks. He was selected at the age of 17 years and 256 days to represent South Australia against Tasmania in late 1984, whilst still a student at Marden High School after less than a year in grade cricket. He was a tall fast bowler, and demonstrated all-round potential when he scored 85 and took 6/76 in a Sheffield Shield match against Victoria in his debut season. This earned him selection on the 1984–85 Australian Under-19 team to tour Sri Lanka and India. His efforts in claiming 11 wickets at an average of just 12, put him into contention for higher honours in the limited overs format. By the age of 21, Zesers had collected more than 100 first class wickets, the only person to have achieved this feat.

He was subsequently selected for the 1987 Cricket World Cup in India. He made his ODI debut against India in the group phase in Delhi, taking 0/37 as India reached 8/289. In Australia's run-chase, he made 2 not out batting at number 10 as Australia were bowled out for 233. He played his second match against New Zealand in Chandigarh, where he scored 8* from four balls after coming in the final overs. He took his only international wicket of John Wright, but after conceding 37 runs in just 6 overs, he was dropped.

A chronic shoulder injury ended his career in 1989–90, at the age of just 23, having played 45 matches and taken 142 wickets at an average of 30.44 with four five wicket hauls and 763 runs at 16.58 with two half centuries. His bowling was characterised by a tendency to attack the stumps, with 36% of his wickets coming through bowling or trapping the batsman LBW.

References

 

1967 births
Living people
Australia One Day International cricketers
South Australia cricketers
Australian cricketers
Australian people of Latvian descent
Cricketers at the 1987 Cricket World Cup